Christopher Darnell Carter (born April 6, 1989) is a former American football outside linebacker. He was drafted by the Pittsburgh Steelers in the fifth round of the 2011 NFL Draft and played college football at Fresno State. After playing seven seasons in the National Football League (NFL), Carter became a business strategist, youth foundation director, and motivational speaker.

High school career
Carter played high school football at Henry Kaiser High School in Fontana, California, where he was teammates with former Tampa Bay Buccaneers wide receiver Shawn Moore. During his high school years his honors included: All-State Third-team; Academic All-State; induction into the San Bernardino Hall of Fame; League Defensive Most Valuable Player; and named to the All-California Interscholastic Federation all-county and all-area team.

College career
Carter played college football at Fresno State earning First-team All-Conference player honors three times and Defensive MVP of the Western Athletic Conference honors and, importantly, a BA Communications degree.

Professional career

Pittsburgh Steelers

He was selected by the Pittsburgh Steelers in the fifth round of the 2011 NFL Draft. He was released on August 30, 2014.

Indianapolis Colts
Carter signed with the Indianapolis Colts on September 9, 2014. Carter was waived by the Colts on October 8, 2014.

Cincinnati Bengals
Carter signed with the Cincinnati Bengals on December 3, 2014. The Bengals released Carter on December 15, 2015.

Baltimore Ravens
On December 21, 2015, Carter was signed by the Baltimore Ravens. He was re-signed by the Ravens on March 15, 2016. He was released on October 12, 2016. Carter later served as NFLPA Board of Player Representative from 2016-2017.

Second stint with the Colts
On October 13, 2016, Carter was signed by the Indianapolis Colts, and served as team captain from 2016-2017.

Washington Redskins
On March 16, 2017, Carter signed with the Washington Redskins. He was carted off the field in the fourth quarter of the Week 14 game against the Los Angeles Chargers. The following day, the team announced Carter suffered a fractured fibula. He was placed on injured reserve on December 12, 2017. Carter now serves as NFLPA Board of Player Representative.

Personal life
Today, Chris is the founder of two foundations: Chris Carter 4 Youth Foundation, which supports children in low-income communities by raising funds to donate food, books and school supplies and The Carter After School Program, a Latino Bilingual Learning Program at Kaiser High School in Fontana, CA,  helps struggling students improve academic performance and prepare them for college. Most recently, Chris was honored by Senator Torres of the 32nd District for philanthropic services to the Fontana Unified School District.

References

External links
 
 

1989 births
Living people
American football defensive ends
American football linebackers
Baltimore Ravens players
Cincinnati Bengals players
Fresno State Bulldogs football players
Indianapolis Colts players
People from Fontana, California
Pittsburgh Steelers players
Players of American football from Los Angeles
Sportspeople from San Bernardino County, California
Washington Redskins players